West Virginia Route 598 is a v-shaped state highway located entirely within Bluefield, West Virginia. The southern terminus of the route is at the Virginia state line (and southern city limits of Bluefield), where WV 598 continues southward as Virginia State Route 598. The northern terminus of the route is at U.S. Route 52 in Bluefield.

WV 598 is a former alignment of US 21 and US 52, the latter of which now runs through the East River Mountain Tunnel with I-77.

Route description

From its southern terminus at SR 598, WV 598 runs to the south-southwest for roughly two miles before intersecting U.S. Route 460. The two routes form a concurrency to the west for a quarter of a mile, where WV 598 turns north onto Cherry Drive. A short distance to the north, as Washington Street, WV 598 reaches the intersection of Washington Street and Cumberland Road. WV 598 turns east onto Cumberland Road for a quarter of a mile to an intersection with  US 52.

Major intersections

598
Transportation in Mercer County, West Virginia